The National Press Foundation is a nonprofit journalism training organization. It educates journalists on complex issues and trains them in reporting tools and techniques. It recognizes and encourages excellence in journalism through its awards.

Since 1976, the 501(c)(3) foundation has provided in-person and online professional development for thousands of editors, producers and reporters around the world, at no cost to them or their news organizations. NPF brings journalists together with leading authorities to help them better understand and explain science, technology, economics, politics, disinformation, health issues and the effects of public policy. All NPF programs are free and on the record. The content is posted on its website for the benefit of journalists and other audiences around the world. NPF programs are held in Washington, D.C., and other U.S. and international cities. It has recently produced trainings on vaccine development, poverty and inequality in America, international trade and the 2020 election.

NPF is run by and for journalists. Its mission is to "make good journalists better."

Awards 
In 1984, NPF created its first award to honor Sol Taishoff, the late founder of Broadcasting Magazine. The foundation now offers a slate of journalism awards to celebrate work that represents the highest standards of journalism. NPF awards are made by a vote of individual committees and ratified by the board of directors. They include:

 Clifford K. and James T. Berryman Award for Editorial Cartooning
 Benjamin C. Bradlee Editor of the Year Award
 Chairman’s Citation — issued at the discretion of the board chair
 Everett McKinley Dirksen Award for Distinguished Reporting of Congress
 The Feddie Reporting Award — for coverage of the impact of federal rules and regulations on local communities
 Hinrich Foundation Award for Distinguished Reporting on Trade
 Innovative Storytelling Award
 W.M. Kiplinger Distinguished Contributions to Journalism Award
 Carolyn C. Mattingly Award for Mental Health Reporting
 Poverty and Inequality 2020 Awards
 Thomas L. Stokes Award for Best Energy and Environment Writing
 Sol Taishoff Broadcaster of the Year Award

History and leadership 
The National Press Foundation was incorporated in the District of Columbia on Aug. 5, 1975, as part of the National Press Club. In 1980, under the leadership of Donald R. Larrabee, it became an independent organization. Its first educational program was a 1981 conference at Princeton University aimed at improving business and economics reporting, held at a time when journalism schools had few programs to prepare business writers. NPF expanded to offer training programs on other topics around the United States, as well as internationally. During the 2020 COVID-19 pandemic, NPF began offering its training online.

The president and COO is Sonni Efron. The chairman of the board is Donna Leinwand Leger. Past presidents of NPF include Sandy K. Johnson, Bob Meyers, Robert Alden, Frank Aukofer, Joseph Slevin, and David Yount, all former journalists.

Organization 
NPF is managed by an executive committee and is governed by a volunteer board of directors.

Programs 
In 2010, NPF offered a training program called Cancer Issues 2010, underwritten by Pfizer. The advertised goal was to train journalists to “understand the latest research” on various cancers, including the role of pharmaceutical products and vaccines. MicroRNA (miRNA) was also a listed topic.

Funding 
NPF is funded by sponsors of individual training programs, an annual awards dinner and an endowment. Sponsors include media organizations, foundations, corporations and individuals.

Some of NPF’s current and recent funders include Arnold Ventures, the Hinrich Foundation, the David & Lucile Packard Foundation, Bloomberg Philanthropies, CNN, Toyota, Twitter, Johnson & Johnson, Fondation Ipsen, Bayer, the Evelyn Y. Davis Foundation, W.K. Kellogg Foundation, GlaxoSmithKline, Heising-Simons Foundation, American Association for Cancer Research, American Society of Addiction Medicine and Honda.

NPF has previously been funded by Pfizer, the Bill & Melinda Gates Foundation, Eli Lilly and Company, the Global HIV Vaccine Enterprise, World Health Organization, TB Alliance, Business Roundtable, Mayo Clinic, Prudential Financial, AdvaMed, Huawei, Pharmaceutical Research and Manufacturers of America (PhRMA), the United States Chamber of Commerce, and Verizon Communications.

Studio works | The Evelyn Y. Davis Studio 
With a grant from Evelyn Y. Davis and The Evelyn Y. Davis Foundation, the National Press Foundation built a broadcast studio in 2014.

References

External links 
 

Organizations established in 1976
American journalism organizations